Alguber is a parish of Cadaval, in Lisbon District, Portugal. The population in 2011 was 957, in an area of 19.26 km².

References

Parishes of Cadaval